Palmitoleoylation is type of protein lipidation where the monounsaturated fatty acid palmitoleic acid is covalently attached to serine or threonine residues of proteins. Palmitoleoylation appears to play a significant role in trafficking and targeting and function of Wnt proteins.

O-Palmiteoylation of Wnt proteins is catalysed by PORCN. The inverse reaction is done by NOTUM.

References

Post-translational modification